Teshome is an Ethiopian name that may refer to:

 Teshome Toga (born 1968), Ethiopian politician
Teshome Dirirsa (born 1994), Ethiopian middle-distance runner
Teshome Gabriel (1939–2010), Ethiopian-born American cinema scholar and professor
Teshome Getu (born 1983), Ethiopian footballer
Meron Teshome (born 1992), Eritrean cyclist
Minyahil Teshome (born 1985), Ethiopian footballer
Mulatu Teshome (born 1955), President of Ethiopia
Theodros Teshome (born 1970), Ethiopian film actor and director

Ethiopian given names
Amharic-language names